Francisco Barreto de Meneses (1616 – 21 January 1688) was a Portuguese military officer and a colonial administrator in the colonies of São Tomé and Príncipe and Brazil.

He was born during the Iberian Union and his Portuguese father was a military officer at Peru. A brave soldier, he was chosen to command the colonial troops in the uprising that took place in Pernambuco which drove out the Dutch from the Northeast of Brazil, finishing the 24-year-long Dutch occupation of Brazil.

He arrived in the colony of Brazil in 1647, was arrested but managed to escape. With the rank of "Master-of-Field-General" (in Portuguese Mestre-de-Campo-General) he commanded the "Patriot Army" of 25,000 men, composed of four Terços, led by Fernandes Vieira, André Vidal de Negreiros, Henrique Dias and Filipe Camarão, beating the Dutch in the First and Second Battle of Guararapes in 1648 and 1649. For such achievement he was awarded with the title of "Restorer of Pernambuco".

He was Governor of Pernambuco and later, from 18 June 1657 to 1663, General-Governor of Brazil, succeeding Dom Jerónimo de Ataíde, 6th Count of Atouguia.

Notes 

1616 births
1688 deaths
People of the Dutch–Portuguese War
Colonial Brazil
Portuguese generals
17th-century Portuguese people